Wirral District Football Association (WDFA) is the organisation responsible for Association football in and around the Wirral Peninsula. It is affiliated to the Cheshire County Association, which in turn is affiliated to the Football Association.

Competitions

Leagues

 Birkenhead & Wirral League (defunct)
 Birkenhead Sunday League
 Eastham & District Junior League
 Ellesmere Port Junior Sunday League
 Ellesmere Port Senior Sunday League
 Wallasey Junior Football League
 Wallasey Sunday League
 West Cheshire League
 Wirral Sunday League (defunct)

Cups

 Senior Cup
 Amateur Cup
 Junior Cup
 Premier Cup
 Sunday Amateur
 Sunday Junior Cup
 Under 18s Youth Cup
 Under 16s Youth Cup
 Under 14s Minor Cup
 Under 12s Minor 'B' Cup

External links
 www.wirraldistrictfa.com

Sport in the Metropolitan Borough of Wirral